The group stage of the 2013 CAF Confederation Cup was played from 19 July to 22 September 2013. A total of eight teams competed in the group stage.

Draw
The draw for the group stage was held on 14 May 2013, 14:00 UTC+2, at the CAF Headquarters in Cairo, Egypt. The eight winners of the play-off round were drawn into two groups of four. There were no seeding.

The following eight teams were entered into the draw (their identity was not known at the time of the draw as it was held before the play-off round was played):

 TP Mazembe
 CS Sfaxien
 Stade Malien
 FUS Rabat
 CA Bizertin
 ES Sétif
 Étoile du Sahel
 Saint George

Format
In the group stage, each group was played on a home-and-away round-robin basis. The winners and runners-up of each group advanced to the semi-finals.

Tiebreakers
The teams are ranked according to points (3 points for a win, 1 point for a tie, 0 points for a loss). If tied on points, tiebreakers are applied in the following order:
Number of points obtained in games between the teams concerned
Goal difference in games between the teams concerned
Away goals scored in games between the teams concerned
Goal difference in all games
Goals scored in all games

Groups
The matchdays were 19–21 July, 2–4 August, 16–18 August, 30 August–1 September, 13–15 September, and 20–22 September 2013.

Group A

Group B

References

External links

2